The Dawes County Courthouse in Chadron, Nebraska, United States, was built in 1935.  It was designed in Art Deco style by John W. Latenser & Sons, Inc.  It is the courthouse of Dawes County, Nebraska.

Located on S. Main St. between 4th and 5th Sts. in Chadron, it was listed on the National Register of Historic Places in 1995;  the listing included the courthouse building and two contributing objects.
It is located at the end of the courthouse square it overlooks, because it was built as a replacement for an older, centered courthouse that remained in use during construction, and which only later was removed.

References

External links 

Courthouses on the National Register of Historic Places in Nebraska
Art Deco architecture in Nebraska
Government buildings completed in 1935
Buildings and structures in Dawes County, Nebraska
County courthouses in Nebraska
Historic districts on the National Register of Historic Places in Nebraska
National Register of Historic Places in Dawes County, Nebraska
Public Works Administration in Nebraska